Guido Reni (4 November 1575 – 18 August 1642) was an Italian painter of the Baroque period, although his works showed a classical manner, similar to Simon Vouet, Nicolas Poussin, and Philippe de Champaigne. He painted primarily religious works, but also mythological and allegorical subjects. Active in Rome, Naples, and his native Bologna, he became the dominant figure in the Bolognese School that emerged under the influence of the Carracci.

Biography
Born in Bologna into a family of musicians, Guido Reni was the only child of Daniele Reni and Ginevra Pozzi.  Apprenticed at the age of nine to the Bolognese studio of Denis Calvaert, he was soon joined in that studio by Albani and Domenichino. 

When Reni was about twenty years old, the three Calvaert pupils migrated to the rising rival studio, named Accademia degli Incamminati (Academy of the "newly embarked", or progressives), led by  Ludovico Carracci. They went on to form the nucleus of a prolific and successful school of Bolognese painters who followed Ludovico's cousin, Annibale Carracci, to Rome.

Reni completed commissions for his first altarpieces while in the Carracci academy. He left the academy by 1598, after an argument with Ludovico Carracci over unpaid work. Around this time he made his first prints, a series commemorating Pope Clement VIII's visit to Bologna in 1598.

Work in Rome
By late 1601 Reni and Albani had moved to Rome to work with the teams led by Annibale Carracci in fresco decoration of the Farnese Palace. By 1604–05 he received an independent commission for an altarpiece of the Crucifixion of St. Peter. After returning briefly to Bologna, he went back to Rome to become one of the premier painters during the papacy of Pope Paul V (Borghese); between 1607 and 1614 he became one of the painters most patronized by the Borghese family.

Located in Casino dell' Aurora on the grounds of the Palazzo Pallavicini-Rospigliosi, is Reni's fresco masterpiece, L'Aurora. The building was originally a pavilion commissioned by Cardinal Scipione Borghese; the rear portion overlooks the Piazza Montecavallo and Palazzo del Quirinale. 

The massive fresco is framed in quadri riportati and depicts Apollo in his Chariot preceded by Dawn (Aurora) bringing light to the world. The work is restrained in classicism, copying poses from Roman sarcophagi, and showing far more simplicity and restraint than Carracci's riotous Triumph of Bacchus and Ariadne in the Farnese. 

In this painting, Reni allies himself more with the sterner  Cavaliere d'Arpino,  Lanfranco, and  Albani "School" of mytho-historic painting, and less with the more crowded frescoes characteristic of Pietro da Cortona. There is little concession to perspective, and the vibrantly colored style is antithetical to the tenebrism of Caravaggio's followers. Documents show that Reni was paid 247 scudi and 54 baiocchi upon completion of his work on 24 September 1616.

In 1630 the Barberini family of Pope Urban VIII commissioned from Reni a painting of the Archangel Michael for the church of Santa Maria della Concezione dei Cappuccini. The painting, completed in 1636, gave rise to an old legend that Reni had represented Satan—crushed under St Michael's foot—with the facial features of  Cardinal Giovanni Battista Pamphilj in revenge for a slight.  

Reni also frescoed the Paoline Chapel of Santa Maria Maggiore in Rome as well as the Aldobrandini wings of the Vatican. According to rumor, the pontifical chapel of Montecavallo (Chapel of the Annunciation) was assigned to Reni to paint.  However, because he felt underpaid by the papal ministers, the artist left Rome once again for Bologna, leaving the role of the pre-eminent artist in Rome to Domenichino.

Work in Naples and return to Bologna

Returning to Bologna more or less permanently after 1614, Reni established a successful and prolific studio there. He was commissioned to decorate the cupola of the chapel of Saint Dominic in Bologna's Basilica of San Domenico between 1613 and 1615, resulting in the radiant fresco Saint Dominic in Glory, a masterpiece that can stand comparison with the exquisite Arca di San Domenico below it.  

He also contributed to the decoration of the Rosary Chapel in the same church with a Resurrection; and in 1611 he had already painted for San Domenico a superb  Massacre of the Innocents (now in the Pinacoteca Nazionale di Bologna) which became an important reference for the French Neoclassic style, as well as a model for details in Picasso's  Guernica.
In 1614–15 he painted The Israelites Gathering Manna for a chapel in the cathedral of Ravenna.

Circa 1615  in Bologna, Reni created one of his most reproduced works, Saint Sebastian (sometimes called by the Italian San Sebastiano). The painting is thought to have been a commission for a member of the papal court due to the presence of lapis lazuli in the blue of the sky, an expensive material usually supplied by clients. Reni painted Saint Sebastian a total of six times, though the 1615 rendition is arguably the most recognizable. Notably, the painting has been adored by Oscar Wilde and other gay artists throughout history. 

Leaving Bologna briefly in 1618, Reni traveled to Naples to complete a commission to paint a ceiling in a chapel of the cathedral of San Gennaro. 
However, in Naples, other prominent local painters, including  Corenzio,  Caracciolo and  Ribera, were vehemently resistant to competitors, and according to rumor, conspired to poison or otherwise harm Reni (as may have befallen Domenichino in Naples after him). Reni's assistant was so badly wounded that he returned to Rome. Reni, who had a great fear of being poisoned, chose not to outstay his welcome.

After leaving Rome, Reni alternately painted in different styles, but displayed less eclectic tastes than many of Carracci's trainees. For example, his altarpiece for Samson Victorious formulates stylized poses, like those characteristic of Mannerism. 

In contrast, his Crucifixion and his Atlanta and Hipomenes depict dramatic diagonal movement coupled with the effects of light and shade that portray the more Baroque influence of Caravaggio. His turbulent yet realistic  Massacre of the Innocents (Pinacoteca, Bologna) is painted in a manner reminiscent of a late  Raphael. In 1625 Prince  Władysław Sigismund Vasa of Poland visited the artist's workshop in Bologna during his visit to Western Europe.
The close rapport between the painter and the Polish prince resulted in the acquisition of drawings and paintings.

In 1630, while Bologna was suffering from plague, Reni painted the Pallion del Voto with images of Saints Ignatius of Loyola and Francis Xavier.

By the 1630s Reni's painting style became looser, less impastoed, and dominated by lighter colors. A compulsive gambler, Reni was often in financial distress despite the steady demand for his paintings. According to his biographer, Carlo Cesare Malvasia, Reni's need to recoup gambling losses resulted in rushed execution and multiple copies of his works produced by his workshop. The paintings of his last years include many unfinished works.

Reni's themes are mostly biblical and mythological.  He painted few portraits; those of  Sixtus V and of Cardinal Bernardino Spada are among the most noteworthy, along with one of his mother (in the Pinacoteca Nazionale di Bologna) and a few self-portraits - both from his youth and from his old age.

The so-called "Beatrice Cenci", formerly ascribed to Reni and praised by generations of admirers, is now regarded as a doubtful attribution. Beatrice Cenci was executed in Rome before Reni ever lived there and thus could not have sat for the portrait. Many etchings are attributed to Guido Reni, some after his own paintings and some after other masters. They are spirited, in a light style of delicate lines and dots. Reni's technique, as used by the Bolognese school, was the standard for Italian printmakers of his time.

Reni died in Bologna in 1642. He was buried there in the Rosary Chapel of the Basilica of San Domenico; the painter Elisabetta Sirani (whose father had been Reni's pupil and whom some considered the artistic reincarnation of Reni) was later interred in the same tomb.

Pupils and legacy
Reni was the most famous Italian artist of his generation. 

Through his many pupils, he had wide-ranging influence on later Baroque. In the center of Bologna he established two studios, teeming with nearly 200 pupils. His most distinguished pupil was Simone Cantarini, named Il Pesarese, who painted the portrait of his master now in the Bolognese Gallery. 

Reni's other Bolognese pupils included Antonio Randa (early on in his career considered the best pupil of Reni, until he tried to kill his master), Vincenzo Gotti, Emilio Savonanzi, Sebastiano Brunetti, Tommaso Campana, Domenico Maria Canuti,
Bartolomeo Marescotti, Giovanni Maria Tamburino, and Pietro Gallinari (Pierino del Signor Guido).

Other artists who trained under Reni include Antonio Giarola (Cavalier Coppa), Giovanni Battista Michelini, Guido Cagnacci, Giovanni Boulanger of Troyes, Paolo Biancucci of Lucca, Pietro Ricci or Righi of Lucca, Pietro Lauri Monsu, Giacomo Semenza,  Gioseffo and Giovanni Stefano Danedi, Giovanni Giacomo Manno, Carlo Cittadini of Milan, Luigi Scaramuccia, Bernardo Cerva, Francesco Costanzo Cattaneo of Ferrara, Francesco Gessi, and Marco Bandinelli.

Beyond Italy, Reni's influence was important in the style of many Spanish Baroque artists, such as Jusepe de Ribera and Murillo.

But his work was particularly appreciated in France—Stendhal believed Reni must have had "a French soul"—and influenced generations of French artists such as Le Sueur, Le Brun, Vien, and Greuze; as well as on later French Neoclassic painters. In the 19th century, Reni's reputation declined as a result of changing taste—epitomized by John Ruskin's censorious judgment that the artist's work was sentimental and false.

A revival of interest in Reni has occurred since 1954, when an important retrospective exhibition of his work was mounted in Bologna.

Partial anthology of works

Galatea and Acis, attributed, Grand Palace at Gatchina (Saint Petersburg), Russia
Self-Portrait
Callisto and Diana
Crucifixion of St Peter, Vatican Museums, Rome
Christ Crucified, San Lorenzo in Lucina, Rome
Cupids Fighting Putti, Doria Pamphilj Gallery, Rome
 Four Seasons, Museo di Capodimonte, Naples
Holy Trinity, Santissima Trinità dei Pellegrini, Rome
Holy Conception, Forlì
Massacre of the Innocents, Pinacoteca Nazionale, Bologna.
Penitent Magdalene ca. 1635, Walters Art Museum, Baltimore
Penitent Peter, Mabee-Gerrer Museum of Art, Shawnee, Oklahoma
Lament over the Body of Christ, Pinacoteca Nazionale, Bologna.
Ecce Homo, Gemaldegälerie, Dresden
Ecce Homo 1639, The Fitzwilliam Museum, Cambridge
Saints Peter and Paul, Pinacoteca di Brera, Milan
Assumption of the Virgin, Sant'Ambrogio, Genoa
Assumption of Mary, Chiesa parrocchiale di Santa Maria, Castelfranco Emilia
St Paul the Hermit and St. Anthony in the Wilderness, Berlin
Fortune, Capitol
Samson Drinking from the Jawbone of an Ass
Ariadne Capitoline Museums
Atalanta and Hippomenes 1612 Prado, Madrid
St Philip Neri in Ecstasy 1614, Roman Oratory church, Santa Maria in Vallicella - The Chiesa Nuova, Rome
Atalanta and Hippomenes 1622–25 Museo di Capodimonte, Naples
Madonna del Rosario, Madonna di San Luca, Bologna
The Labors of Hercules, Louvre.
The Suicide of Lucrezia ca. 1625–40 São Paulo Art Museum, São Paulo
Lucrezia and Cleopatra, Pinacoteca Capitolina, Rome.
Polyphemus, Pinacoteca Capitolina, Rome.
Annunziata Chapel, Quirinal Palace, Rome
San Sebastiano, Pinacoteca Nazionale, Bologna
Saint Sebastian, Dulwich Picture Gallery; other versions are in the collections of the Cheltenham Art Gallery and Museum in the UK, the Palazzo Rosso in Genoa, the Capitoline Museum, the Louvre and at least 7 other known originals and multiple copies such as at the Kunsthistorisches Museum in Vienna.
Saint John the Baptist in the Wilderness, Dulwich Picture Gallery
Adoration of the Magi, Certosa di San Martino, Naples
Judith, Birmingham Museum of Art, Birmingham, Alabama, United States
Lotta di Putti, Galleria Doria Pamphilj, Rome
The Flagellation, St. Francis Xavier Church, Taos, Missouri, United States
Saint John the Evangelist, Muscarelle Museum of Art, Williamsburg, VA
The Triumph of Job Paris, Cathedral of Notre Dame
Jesus Christ with the Cross, Real Academia de Bellas Artes de San Fernando, Madrid.
The Conversion of Saint Paul, Patrimonio nacional, Madrid.
An Evangelist, House of Alba Foundation, at Liria Palace, Madrid.
The Louvre contains twenty of his pictures, the Prado Museum in Madrid eighteen, the National Gallery of London seven, and others once there have now been removed to other public collections. Among the seven is the small Coronation of the Virgin, painted on copper. It was probably painted before the master left Bologna for Rome.

Gallery

References and sources

References

Sources
 Cavalli, Gian Carlo (ed.)Guido Reni exh. cat. Bologna 1954
 Pepper, Stephen, Guido Reni, Oxford 1984
 Marzia Faietti, 'Rome 1610: Guido Reni after Annibale Carracci' Print Quarterly, XXVIII, 2011, pp. 276–81
 Orlandi, Pellegrino Antonio; Guarienti, Pietro, Abecedario Pittorico, Naples, 1719 
 Guido Reni 1575-1642 (exhibition catalogue Pinacoteca Nazionale, Bologna; Los Angeles County Museum of art; Kimbell Art Museum, Fort Worth) Bologna 1988
 Spear, Richard,  The 'Divine' Guido: Religion, Sex, Money, and Art in the World of Guido Reni, New Haven and London, 1997
 Hansen, Morten Steen and Joaneath Spicer, eds., Masterpieces of Italian Painting, The Walters Art Museum, Baltimore and London, 2005
 "Printmaking". Encyclopædia Britannica. 2007. Encyclopædia Britannica Online. 29 March 2007

External links

Orazio and Artemisia Gentileschi, a fully digitized exhibition catalog from The Metropolitan Museum of Art Libraries, which contains material on Guido Reni (see index)
Jusepe de Ribera, 1591-1652, a full text exhibition catalog from The Metropolitan Museum of Art, which includes material on Guido Reni (see index)
 A poem about which models Guido Reni used for female subjects 

1575 births
1642 deaths
Painters from Bologna
16th-century Italian painters
Italian male painters
17th-century Italian painters
Italian Baroque painters
Italian portrait painters
Burials at the Basilica of San Domenico